Central Baptist Church in St. Louis, Missouri was founded as the Second African Baptist Church in 1846.

Early pastors were Reverend Richard Sneethen, (1846-1847) and Reverend John Richard Anderson, (1847-1863).  The church has an executive pastor and seven associate pastors.

The church celebrated its 170th anniversary on March 4, 2016, with an event where the guest speaker was Reverend Dr. Jerry Young, President of the National Baptist Convention, USA, Inc.

The church membership in 2016 was about 1,500, with about 750-900 attending services weekly.  Its senior pastor from 1999 to 2016, Reverend Dr. Robert C. Scott, left in 2016 to head an even larger congregation in Charlotte, North Carolina.

See also
 First Baptist Church City of St. Louis, founded in 1827 as the First African Baptist Church

References

Further reading

External links
Central Baptist Church, official site

Baptist churches in Missouri
1846 establishments in Missouri
Religious organizations established in 1846
Buildings and structures in St. Louis
19th-century Baptist churches in the United States
Midtown St. Louis